The 2003 Sugar Bowl, a 2002–03 BCS game, was played on January 1, 2003. This 69th edition to the Sugar Bowl featured the Georgia Bulldogs, and the Florida State Seminoles. Georgia came into the game 12–1 and ranked 3rd in the BCS, whereas Florida State came into the game 9–4 and ranked 14th in the BCS.  Sponsored by Nokia, the game was officially known as the Nokia Sugar Bowl.

Teams
The Sugar Bowl during the BCS era usually selected the SEC champion, meaning that the winner of the SEC in 2002, Georgia received an invitation to the Sugar Bowl. Their opponent would be ACC champion Florida State.

Georgia Bulldogs

Georgia defeated Arkansas in the 2002 SEC Championship Game to earn a BCS berth as their conference's champion. Georgia entered the bowl with a 12–1 record (7–1 in conference).

Florida State Seminoles

Florida State won the ACC title outright by virtue of their 7–1 conference record. At the time, the ACC champion would go to the Orange Bowl, however the Orange Bowl chose Iowa and USC instead, leaving the Seminoles to play in the Sugar Bowl. Florida State entered the bowl with an 9–4 record (7–1 in conference).

Game summary
Kicker Billy Bennett kicked a 23-yard field goal with 10 minutes left in the opening quarter to account for the quarter's only points. In the second quarter, FSU quarterback Fabian Walker threw a 5-yard slant pass to Anquan Boldin as FSU took a 7–3 lead. Florida State was driving again in the second quarter before cornerback Bruce Thornton stepped in front of a Walker pass and raced 73 yards to the opposite end zone, to give Georgia a 10–7 lead. Quarterback D.J. Shockley threw a 37-yard touchdown pass to Terrence Edwards before halftime to give the Bulldogs a 17–7 half time lead.

Billy Bennett accounted for two more Georgia field goals in the third quarter, as Georgia posted a 23–7 lead. On the final play of the third quarter, wide receiver Anquan Boldin (who had replaced quarterback Fabian Walker) threw a 40-yard touchdown pass to Craphonso Thorpe. The ensuing two-point conversion failed, and the lead was 23–13. Billy Bennett kicked another field goal in the fourth quarter, as Georgia held off Florida State. Georgia's running back Musa Smith won the MVP award.

The Seminoles defensive tackle Darnell Dockett was suspended from the game after pleading guilty to a misdemeanor theft charge.

Scoring summary

Statistics

Aftermath
Georgia completed the season 13–1. They ranked #3 in both major polls. Florida State finished the season 9–5 and #21/#24 in the polls.

References

Sugar Bowl
Sugar Bowl
Florida State Seminoles football bowl games
Georgia Bulldogs football bowl games
Sugar Bowl
January 2003 sports events in the United States